Avanigadda is a town in Krishna district of the Indian state of Andhra Pradesh. It is the mandal headquarters of Avanigadda mandal in Machilipatnam revenue division.

Geography 
Avanigadda is located on the banks of the Krishna River. It is located 30 km away from the delta of Krishna River and Bay of Bengal.

Climate

Due to its proximity to the Bay of Bengal, Avanigadda and its surrounding villages are prone to cyclones and floods. It is devastated by 1977 Andhra Pradesh cyclone which had a velocity over 200 kmph. A memorial, at the point of furthest advance of the Storm surge was built near this village in memory of the people who died in the storm.

Culture and tourism 

Penumudi–Puligadda Bridge, Srikakulam Srikakulandhra Vishnu Temple, Mopidevi Sri Subrahmanyeswara Swamy Temple, Hamasaladeevi beach etc., are the tourism attractions in the town. Temples such as Sri Addanki Nancharamma Temple at Viswanadhapalli, Sri Lankamma Ammavari Temple and Sri Lakshmi Narayana Swamy temple are the main religious destinations.

Politics 

Buddha Prasad Mandali who was also Deputy speaker of Andhra Pradesh Assembly in TDP government. has lost to Simhadri Ramesh Babu in 2019 elections.

Transport
Repalle is the nearest town from Avanigadda which is 10 km away. State-run APS RTC has a bus depot in this village and runs busses to nearest towns and Vijayawada, Visakhapatnam and Hyderabad, among other places. APS RTC runs Palle Velugu, Express, Deluxe, Super Luxury, Indra and Night Rider class of busses. 

Private players also run their services from Avanigadda to major cities, and compete with the state run APSRTC, by plying busses to the places where the state-run transport corporation doesn't. Although, Avanigadda lacks direct rail connectivity, it is still a popular choice of transport. The nearest railway station (Repalle railway station), which lies 10 km away in Repalle.

See also 
Villages in Avanigadda mandal

References 

Villages in Krishna district
Mandal headquarters in Krishna district